This list of notable flash floods summarizes the most widely reported events.

See also 
 List of deadliest floods
 List of major dam failures
 2021 European floods

References 

Flash
Flash